June 2017 London terror attacks may refer to any of following separate events:

 The 2017 London Bridge attack on 3 June
 The 2017 Finsbury Park attack on 19 June